Toydensky is a rural locality (a settlement) in Oktyabrskoye Rural Settlement, Paninsky District, Voronezh Oblast, Russia. The population was 166 as of 2010. There are 3 streets.

Geography 
Toydensky is located 20 km south of Panino (the district's administrative centre) by road. Oktyabrsky is the nearest rural locality.

References 

Rural localities in Paninsky District